Mudhal Mudhal Mudhal Varai also known as M3V, is a 2008 Tamil language film directed by debutant Krishnan Seshadri Gomatam, who previously worked as an assistant to Mani Rathnam and P. C. Sreeram. The film stars Sathyajit, Anuja Iyer, and Charan. This film features a hundred new faces for the first time in Tamil cinema.

Cast 
Sathyajit as Hayagreev "Haggy"
Anuja Iyer as Sindhu
Charan as Mahesh
Vidya Easwaran as Maya
Keevna as Tryaeshika
E. Kumaravel as Gopal
M. V. Sriram
Murari
Senthil as Selvam "Shakespeare"

Production
The film was made on a budget of ₹2.5 crore (worth ₹9.2 crore in 2021 prices) and featured over 100 new faces.

Soundtrack 
The songs were composed by Aslam Mustafa.
"Soup Song"
"Kondadum" - M. J. Shriram

Awards and nominations

Critical reception 
Behindwoods wrote "M3V is not something that one would expect to be accepted at all levels. In fact, one would give it chances only in multiplexes and even here only select audience with patience and observation might be able to fully appreciate it. Niche, is what we would like to call it. Congrats, director Krishna Shehsadri Komadam for being daringly different." Rediff wrote "Commercial movie-lovers might not find this to their taste but if you're a lover of fairly realistic cinema, capturing the life of an urban metrosexual's life and times, then M3V is for you".

References 

2008 films
2000s Tamil-language films
Indian independent films
2008 directorial debut films